LGBT Qaamaneq – Landsforeningen for Bøsser, Lesbiske, Biseksuelle og Transpersoner i Grønland  was a lobby group for gay, lesbian, bisexual and transgender people in Greenland.

The association was founded in 2014. It was a revival of an earlier organization, also named Qaamaneq, which had folded due to lack of active participation, resulting from the phenomenon of LGBT Greenlanders often moving to the mainland of Denmark to participate in a larger LGBT community. The original organization, active from 2002 to 2007, had been led by Erik Olsen.

LGBT Qaamaneq's aim is to work for gay, lesbian, bisexual and transgender people's political, social, cultural and workplace equality at every level of society. The association seeks to work against discrimination and to function as a dedicated lobby for the purpose of influencing lawmakers, for example in areas such as marriages, adoption, the artificial insemination of lesbians, and rights for transpersons.

The group achieved a notable success when same-sex marriage in Greenland was legalized by the Inatsisartut on May 26, 2015.

Chairpersons
 2014 – 2015: Tina Egede
 2015 – 2017: Ivalu Rosing
 2017 – : Jan Joe Siedsen

See also

LGBT rights in Greenland
LGBT rights in Denmark
LGBT rights in the Americas
List of LGBT rights organizations
Nuuk Pride

References

External links
 LGBT Qaamaneq

2014 establishments in Greenland
LGBT political advocacy groups in Greenland
2014 in LGBT history
Organizations established in 2014